The Forgery, Abolition of Punishment of Death Act 1832 (2&3 Will.4 c. 123) was an Act of the Parliament of the United Kingdom of Great Britain and Ireland. It abolished the death penalty for all offences of forgery, except for forging wills and certain powers of attorney. (The exception was abolished in 1837.)

See also
Capital punishment in the United Kingdom

References

Public General Statutes, London: J. Richards, 1832; page 857

United Kingdom Acts of Parliament 1832
Anti–death penalty laws
Forgery